HMS Tireless, a Taciturn- or T-class submarine, was the first ship of the Royal Navy to bear that name. She was authorized under the 1941 War Emergency Programme and her keel was laid down on 30 October 1941 at Portsmouth Dockyard. She was launched on 19 March 1943 and was completed on 18 April 1945.

Operational Service
Commissioned on 18 April 1945, towards the end of the Second World War, Tireless operated in the Far East between late 1945 and 1946 and then in home waters commanded by M L C Crawford. In 1951 she was the first of her class to be streamlined at HM Naval Dockyard, Devonport. In 1953 she took part in the Fleet Review to celebrate the Coronation of Queen Elizabeth II.

By the late 1950s she was again modernised at Chatham Dockyard. In 1959 Tireless was part of the Home Fleet and took part in 'Navy Days' in Portsmouth during that year. Beginning in 1960, the submarine was the first command of future Adm. Sandy Woodward, who led Royal Navy forces in the South Atlantic during the 1982 Falklands War.

She remained in service until August 1963 when she was put on the sale list. She was broken up in 1968.

References

Publications
 
 

 

British T-class submarines of the Royal Navy
Ships built in Portsmouth
1943 ships
World War II submarines of the United Kingdom
Cold War submarines of the United Kingdom